The Men's giant slalom competition of the Grenoble 1968 Olympics was held at Chamrousse.

The defending world champion was Guy Perillat of France, while France's Jean-Claude Killy was the defending World Cup giant slalom champion, who also led the 1968 World Cup, along with Switzerland's Edmund Bruggmann.

Results

References 

Men's giant slalom
Winter Olympics